The 1984 CCHA Men's Ice Hockey Tournament was the 13th CCHA Men's Ice Hockey Tournament. It was played between March 2 and March 10, 1984. First round games were played at campus sites, while 'final four' games were played at Joe Louis Arena in Detroit, Michigan. By winning the tournament, Michigan State received the Central Collegiate Hockey Association's automatic bid to the 1984 NCAA Division I Men's Ice Hockey Tournament.

Format
The tournament featured three rounds of play. The four teams that finished below eighth place in the standings were not eligible for postseason play. In the quarterfinals, the first and eighth seeds, the second and seventh seeds, the third seed and sixth seeds and the fourth seed and fifth seeds played a two-game series where the team that scored the higher number of goals after the games was declared the victor and advanced to the semifinals. In the semifinals, the remaining highest and lowest seeds and second highest and second lowest seeds play a single-game, with the winners advancing to the finals. The tournament champion receives an automatic bid to the 1984 NCAA Division I Men's Ice Hockey Tournament.

Conference standings
Note: GP = Games played; W = Wins; L = Losses; T = Ties; PTS = Points; GF = Goals For; GA = Goals Against

Bracket

Note: * denotes overtime period(s)

First round

(1) Bowling Green vs. (8) Lake Superior State

(2) Ohio State vs. (7) Ferris State

(3) Michigan State vs. (6) Michigan Tech

(4) Northern Michigan vs. (5) Western Michigan

Semifinals

(1) Bowling Green vs. (5) Western Michigan

(2) Ohio State vs. (3) Michigan State

Consolation Game

(1) Bowling Green vs. (2) Ohio State

Championship

(3) Michigan State vs. (5) Western Michigan

Tournament awards

All-Tournament Team
F Dan Dorion (Western Michigan)
F Gord Flegel (Michigan State)
F Newell Brown (Michigan State)
D Jeff Eisley (Michigan State)
D Dave Ellett (Bowling Green)
G Norm Foster (Michigan State)

MVP
Glenn Healy (Western Michigan)

References

External links
CCHA Champions
1983–84 CCHA Standings
1983–84 NCAA Standings

CCHA Men's Ice Hockey Tournament
Ccha tournament